Wynnum was an electoral district of the Legislative Assembly in the Australian state of Queensland from 1923 to 1986.

The district was based in the eastern suburbs of Brisbane and named for the suburb of Wynnum.

Members for Wynnum
The members for Wynnum were:

Election results

References

Former electoral districts of Queensland
1923 establishments in Australia
1986 disestablishments in Australia